Duncanston is a scattered crofting and rural village, lying 3 miles east of Conon Bridge, on the Black Isle in Inverness, within the Scottish Highlands and is part of the  Scottish council area of Highland.

References

Populated places on the Black Isle